Mamado Bamba Ndiaye (4 April 1949 – 3 July 2020) was a Senegalese journalist, islamologist, and politician. He served as Minister of Religious Affairs under the presidency of Abdoulaye Wade from 2000 to 2012. He supported Malick Gakou as Parti Grand leader in 2012, and Macky Sall for President of Senegal in 2019. Ndiaye was also director of the daily newspaper Le Messager. He died on 3 July 2020 at the age of 71.

References

1949 births
2020 deaths 
Senegalese politicians
Senegalese journalists
Religious affairs ministers of Senegal